The Comibaenini are a tribe of geometer moths in the subfamily Geometrinae.

Selected genera
Comibaena Hübner, 1823
Microbaena Hausmann, 1996
Proteuchloris Hausmann, 1996
Thetidia Boisduval, 1840

References

 , 2012: The Comibaenini of China (Geometridae: Geometrinae), with a review of the tribe. Zoological Journal of the Linnean Society 165 (4): 723-772.

 
Geometrinae